The twenty-five Kansai flower temples or twenty-five sacred Kansai flower temples are a multi-sect association of twenty-five Japanese Buddhist temples in the Kansai region that are known for their flower and foliage displays. The organization was founded in 1993 and includes temples in the Hyōgo, Kyoto, Nara, Osaka, Shiga, and Wakayama Prefectures.

The abbots of each temple provide large groups of 10 or more a Buddhist flower sermon, and the flower temples are common destinations for hanami (flower viewing) as well as pilgrimages which can include collecting shuin (seal stamps) from each of the temples.

The abbots of each of the twenty-five temples gather annually to hold a flower ceremony at one of the temples.

Temples

References

External links
 (Japanese)

Buddhist pilgrimage sites in Japan
Buddhist temples in Nara Prefecture
Buddhist temples in Wakayama Prefecture
Buddhist temples in Kyoto Prefecture
Buddhist temples in Osaka Prefecture
Buddhist temples in Hyōgo Prefecture
Buddhist temples in Shiga Prefecture